Alad may refer to the following places:

 Alad, Seydun, a village in Iran
 Alad, an island barangay in Romblon, Romblon, Philippines
 ALAD, a human gene that encodes the enzyme delta-aminolevulinic acid dehydratase